Aleksey Anatolievich Rozin (born 4 February 1978) is a Russian film and stage actor.

Biography
Rozin studied at the Moscow Art Theatre School. He has acted on stage with productions such as История об истории,

In film he appeared in director Andrey Zvyagintsev's  Elena (2011) and Leviathan (2014), before taking the lead role in Loveless, which went to the 2017 Cannes Film Festival. Zvyagintsev said it was natural to cast Rozin as the character Boris as they worked together twice before.

Filmography

References

External links
 

1978 births
21st-century Russian male actors
Living people
Russian male film actors
Russian male television actors
Russian male stage actors